Osipkov–Merritt models (named for Leonid Osipkov and David Merritt) are mathematical representations of spherical stellar systems (galaxies, star clusters, globular clusters etc.).  The Osipkov–Merritt formula generates a one-parameter family of phase-space distribution functions that reproduce a specified density profile (representing stars) in a specified gravitational potential (in which the stars move). The density and potential need not be self-consistently related.  
A free parameter adjusts the degree of velocity anisotropy, from isotropic to completely radial motions.  The method is a generalization of Eddington's formula  for constructing isotropic spherical models.

The method was derived independently by its two eponymous discoverers. The latter derivation includes two additional families of models (Type IIa, b) with tangentially anisotropic motions.

Derivation

According to Jeans's theorem, the phase-space density of stars f must be expressible in terms of the isolating integrals of motion, which in a spherical stellar system are the energy E and the angular momentum J. The Osipkov-Merritt ansatz is

where ra, the "anisotropy radius", is a free parameter. This ansatz implies that f is constant on spheroids in velocity space since

where vr, vt are velocity components parallel and perpendicular to the radius vector r and Φ(r) is the gravitational potential.

The density ρ is the integral over velocities of f:

which can be written

or

This equation has the form of an Abel integral equation and can be inverted to give f in terms of ρ:

Properties

Following a derivation similar to the one above, the velocity dispersions in an Osipkov–Merritt model satisfy

This is a desirable feature, since stellar systems that form via gravitational collapse have isotropic cores and radially-anisotropic envelopes.

If ra is assigned too small a value, f may be negative for some Q. This is a consequence of the fact that spherical mass models can not always be reproduced by purely radial orbits.  Since the number of stars on an orbit can not be negative, values of ra that generate negative f'''s are unphysical. This result can be used to constrain the maximum degree of anisotropy of spherical galaxy models.

In his 1985 paper, Merritt defined two additional families of models ("Type II") that have isotropic cores and tangentially anisotropic envelopes.  Both families assume

.

In Type IIa models, the orbits become completely circular at r=ra and remain so at all larger radii.
In Type IIb models, stars beyond ra move on orbits of various eccentricities, although the motion is always biased toward circular. In both families, the tangential velocity dispersion undergoes a jump as r increases past ra.

C. M. Carollo et al.'' (1995) derive many observable properties of Type I Osipkov–Merritt models.

Applications

Typical applications of Osipkov–Merritt models include:

 Modelling of star clusters, galaxies, dark matter halos  and galaxy clusters
 Constructing anisotropic galaxy models for studies of dynamical instabilities

See also

 Stellar dynamics

References 

Astrophysics